The IFF World Ranking is a ranking of the national teams of member countries of the International Floorball Federation.

Ranking system

The ranking is based on the standings of the two most recent Floorball World Championships. That is 2018 and 2020 for men and 2019 and 2021 for women.

The ranking is also used to determine the seeding of the teams for the next Floorball World Championships. National champions from the top four ranked countries compete at the Champions Cup.

Current rankings
Source:

Men
Women

Notes and references 

Floorball
Sports world rankings